South Mountain is the northern extension of the Blue Ridge Mountain range in Maryland and Pennsylvania. From the Potomac River near Knoxville, Maryland in the south to Dillsburg, Pennsylvania in York County, Pennsylvania in the north, the  range separates the Hagerstown and Cumberland valleys from the Piedmont regions of the two states. The Appalachian National Scenic Trail follows the crest of the mountain through Maryland and a portion of Pennsylvania.

Geography
South of the Potomac River in Virginia, the ridge continues as Short Hill Mountain for about  before subsiding near the town of Hillsboro. South Mountain in Maryland gradually grows higher and wider towards the north. Near the Pennsylvania border, the mountain merges with the hills of the parallel Catoctin Mountain range to the east and becomes more like a low mountain range than a single crest. The mountain then turns more to the east and becomes a series of small rocky hills between Mount Holly Springs and the northeastern end of the mountain at Dillsburg.

Major summits

Maryland

From south to north:
Monument Knob, 
Bartman Hill, 
Pine Knob, 
Buzzard Knob, 
Quirauk Mountain, highest point on South Mountain in Maryland

Pennsylvania

From south to north, then east:
Mount Dunlop, 
Monterey Peak, 
Clermont Crag, 
Wildcat Rocks, 
Virginia Rock, 
Buzzard Peak/Chimney Rocks, 
Snowy Mountain, 
Green Ridge, 
Mount Newman, 
Piney Mountain, 
Big Pine Flat Ridge, highest point on South Mountain in Pennsylvania
Big Flat Ridge, 
East Big Flat Ridge, 
Mount Holly, 
Long Mountain, 
Center Point Knob, midpoint of the Appalachian Trail in 1935
White Rocks,

Gaps

Maryland
From south to north:
Crampton's Gap, between Burkittsville and Gapland
Fox's Gap, between Middletown and Boonsboro
Harman Gap (Oeiler's Gap), east of Cavetown
Turner's Gap, between Middletown and Boonsboro, traversed by U.S. Route 40 Alternate

Pennsylvania
From south to north:
Monterey Gap, at Blue Ridge Summit (see also Fairfield Gap)
Pass near Mount Newman, traversed by U.S. Route 30

State reservations

Maryland
From south to north:
South Mountain State Park, length of the ridge crest in Maryland
Gathland State Park, Crampton Gap
Washington Monument State Park, near Boonsboro
Greenbrier State Park, near Boonsboro

Pennsylvania
From south to north:
Michaux State Forest, covering most of the mountain
Caledonia State Park, east of Fayetteville
Kings Gap State Park
Pine Grove Furnace State Park, current midpoint of the Appalachian Trail

Conservation
In Pennsylvania, the region surrounding is the focus of a Conservation Landscape Initiative, led by the Pennsylvania Department of Conservation and Natural Resources (DCNR) and the Appalachian Trail Conservancy. The initiative is organized as South Mountain Partnership, which involves other organizations, government, business, and community members.

History
The history of South Mountain defines the early history of western Maryland.  It was viewed as a boundary to the Susquehannock in their original treaty granting land to Maryland.  In a 1732 letter to the colonial governor of Maryland, Captain Civility (Togotolisa) chief of Conestoga warns against settlement in the valley beyond the mountain. The first Euromerican land grant west of South Mountain by Maryland was William Park's "Park Hall" in 1731 near Crampton's gap. The earliest route of the Great Wagon Road crossed South Mountain by Fox's Gap on a course between Middletown and Sharpsburg.  Other important passes for migration and settlement were Turner's Gap near Boonsboro. Orr's Gap, used today by Interstate 70, and the course of "Cartledge's Old Road" generally following Maryland state route 77. Maryland finally gained clear title to the lands west of South Mountain at the 1744 Treaty of Lancaster.  Following the 1859 John Brown's Raid on Harpers Ferry seven of the raiders escaped from the Kennedy Farm headquarters to Pennsylvania by following (Elk ridge and) South Mountain north.  The escapees traveled by night and spent the days in cold camps among the densest thickets they could find along the remote ridge top.  They finally left the mountain near today's Caledonia State Park between Chambersburg and Gettysburg, Pennsylvania. The Battle of South Mountain was fought on the mountain at Crampton's, Fox and Turner's gaps during the Maryland Campaign of the American Civil War in 1862. In 1863, military engagements of the Gettysburg Campaign on the mountain range included the Fight at Monterey Pass near the Mason–Dixon Line.

References

 01
Blue Ridge Mountains
Mountain ranges of Maryland
Mountain ranges of Pennsylvania
Mountains on the Appalachian Trail
Subranges of the Appalachian Mountains
Landforms of Cumberland County, Pennsylvania
Landforms of Franklin County, Pennsylvania
Landforms of Frederick County, Maryland
Landforms of Washington County, Maryland